WAPDA Town ('''') is a residential neighborhood or a Housing Society located within union council 255 (Wapda Town) in Lahore, Punjab, Pakistan. It is now considered as one of the most expensive and upscale residential Societies of the city of Lahore.

Location 
It is located in a very posh locality of Lahore. And now considered as greater Center of Lahore having all the Banks and Shopping Malls in Main Boulevard Road. . WAPDA Town on Google Maps website

Subdivisions 
WAPDA Town is divided into three Phases, which are further divided into blocks.

See also
Valencia Town
Johar Town
PIA Society

References

Populated places in Lahore District
Company towns in Pakistan
Town